Oylegate–Glenbrien GAA is a Gaelic Athletic Association club located in the villages of Oylegate (Oilgate) and Glenbrien in County Wexford, Ireland. The club fields teams in both hurling and Gaelic football.

Honours

 Wexford Senior Hurling Championship (1): 1963
 Wexford Intermediate Hurling Championship (5): 1959, 1992, 2012, 2016, 2021
 Wexford Junior Hurling Championship (1): 1955

References

External links
Oylegate–Glenbrien GAA site

Gaelic games clubs in County Wexford
Hurling clubs in County Wexford
Gaelic football clubs in County Wexford